Haradatta is the name of various medieval Sanskrit scholars.

the author of Padamanjari, a commentary on the Kashikavritti commentary on Pāṇini, and Mitakshara, a commentary on Gautama's Apasthambha Dharmasutra
the author of Śruti Sūkti Mālā and Harihara Tāratamya
the author of Ganakarika